The Tengku Ampuan Jemaah Mosque or Bukit Jelutong Mosque is a Selangor's royal mosque located in Bukit Jelutong (Section U8) near Shah Alam, Malaysia. It is the second state mosque of Selangor after Sultan Salahuddin Abdul Aziz Shah Mosque in Section 14. This royal mosque was named after the consort of the late Almarhum Sultan Sir Hisamuddin Alam Shah, late Almarhumah Tengku Ampuan Jemaah of Selangor. She was also the second Raja Permaisuri Agong (Queen) of Malaysia.

History
The mosque was built by Sime Darby Properties which is also a developer of Bukit Jelutong. Construction of the mosque began on 2010 and was completed on 2012. The mosque was officially opened by the Sultan Sharafuddin Idris Shah of Selangor on 13 March 2013.

Architecture
Middle Eastern.

See also
 Islam in Malaysia

References

External links
Tengku Ampuan Jemaah Mosque website

Mosques in Selangor
2013 establishments in Malaysia
Mosques completed in 2012